Laytonville Unified School District is a public school district in Mendocino County, California, United States.

References

External links 
 

School districts in Mendocino County, California
Education in Mendocino County, California
1981 establishments in California
School districts established in 1981